Gabriel Sîncrăian (born 21 December 1988) is a Romanian weightlifter who competes in the 85 kg weight division.

Career
He took part in the 2012 and 2016 Olympics and won a bronze medal in the same 85-kg event in 2016. Sîncrăian won two more medals at the European championships in 2012 and 2016.

On 13 October 2016, the IWF reported that Sincraian had tested positive for excess testosterone in a test connected to the Rio Olympics, and he was stripped of the medal.

In November 2020, the reanalysed doping tests from the 2012 Summer Olympics turned out positive for metenolone and stanozolol as well.

References 

Romanian male weightlifters
1988 births
Living people
Weightlifters at the 2012 Summer Olympics
Weightlifters at the 2016 Summer Olympics
Olympic weightlifters of Romania
Competitors stripped of Summer Olympics medals
Doping cases in weightlifting
Romanian sportspeople in doping cases
Universiade medalists in weightlifting
Universiade bronze medalists for Romania
European Weightlifting Championships medalists
Medalists at the 2013 Summer Universiade
Sportspeople from Cluj-Napoca
20th-century Romanian people
21st-century Romanian people